Leading Creek is a tributary of the Little Kanawha River,  long, in central West Virginia in the United States.

Leading Creek rises just west of Camden in Lewis County and flows west-southwestward into Gilmer County, through the unincorporated communities of Alum Bridge and Pickle Street in Lewis County and Linn and Troy in Gilmer County.

Between Camden and Troy, the creek's course is paralleled by the Staunton and Parkersburg Turnpike, along present-day U.S. routes 33 and 119 between Camden and Linn; and West Virginia Route 47 between Linn and Troy.

According to the West Virginia Department of Environmental Protection, approximately 84% of the Leading Creek watershed is forested, mostly deciduous.  Approximately 15% is used for pasture and agriculture.

According to the Geographic Names Information System, Leading Creek has also been known historically by the spelling "Leeding Creek." According to tradition, Leading Creek was so named by explorers who used it to navigate.

Flow rate
The highest recorded flow during the period was 12,100 cu ft/s (343 m³/s) on June 25, 1950. The lowest recorded flow was 0.1 cu ft/s (0 m³/s) on several days in September 1939.

See also
List of rivers of West Virginia

References 

Rivers of West Virginia
Little Kanawha River
Rivers of Gilmer County, West Virginia
Rivers of Lewis County, West Virginia